Mullets was a short-lived American comic strip by Rick Stromoski and Steve McGarry. The comic revolved around the characters Kevin and Scab, two dim-witted friends (with mullet haircuts) who shared a trailer and worked at a place called Mildew's Hardware Store.

References

American comic strips
2003 comics debuts
2005 comics endings
Comic strips started in the 2000s
Comic strips ended in the 2000s
Gag-a-day comics